Ultimate Sinatra is a 2015 compilation album by American singer Frank Sinatra released specifically to commemorate the 100-year anniversary of his birth. The collection consists of songs recorded from 1939 to 1979 during his sessions for Columbia Records, Capitol Records, and Reprise Records. The 4-CD set consists of 100 songs, plus a never before released bonus track of a rehearsal recording of "The Surrey With the Fringe On Top" from the musical Oklahoma!  This edition also features an 80-page booklet with a new essay by Sinatra historian and author Charles Pignone, as well as rare photos and quotes from Sinatra, his family members and key collaborators.

A single-disc version also was released, consisting of 24 tracks from the box set plus an exclusive alternate studio take of "Just In Time." The Australian 2-CD edition adds a complete, previously unreleased recording of Sinatra's December 1961 concert at Sydney Stadium. The American release truncates the Sydney show.

Track listing
Box set edition
(Note: all composers' and arrangers' names listed below are in the order they appear in the box set booklet. "Arranged by" is abbreviated as "arr. by" below.)

Disc one
"All or Nothing at All" (Jack Lawrence/Arthur Altman)―arr. by Andy Gibson – 2:58
"I'll Never Smile Again" (Ruth Lowe)―arr. by Fred Stulce – 3:10
"Street of Dreams" (Victor Young/Sam M. Lewis)―arr. by Axel Stordahl – 2:41
"You'll Never Know" (Mack Gordon/Harry Warren)—arr. by Alec Wilder – 3:01
"If You Are But a Dream" (Moe Jaffe/Jack Fulton/Nat Bonx)—arr. by Stordahl – 3:01
"Saturday Night (Is the Loneliest Night of the Week)" (Jule Styne/Sammy Cahn)—arr. by George Siravo – 3:04
"Nancy (With the Laughing Face)" (Phil Silvers/Jimmy Van Heusen)—arr. by Stordahl – 3:13
"Oh, What It Seemed to Be" (Bennie Benjamin/George Weiss/Frankie Carle)—arr. by Stordahl - 2:59
"Five Minutes More" (Styne/Cahn)—arr. by Stordahl - 2:35
"Time After Time" (Styne/Cahn)—arr. by Stordahl - 3:08 
"Night and Day" (Cole Porter)—arr. by Stordahl - 3:39
"The Song Is You" (Oscar Hammerstein II/Jerome Kern)—arr. by Stordahl - 3:21
"I'm a Fool to Want You" (Jack Wolf/Joel Herron/Frank Sinatra)—arr. by Stordahl - 2:55
"The Birth of the Blues" (Buddy G. DeSylva/Lew Brown/Ray Henderson)—arr. by Henie Beau
"Why Try to Change Me Now?" (Cy Coleman/Joseph A. McCarthy)—arr. by Percy Faith
"I've Got the World on a String" (Harold Arlen/Ted Koehler)—arr. by Nelson Riddle - 2:11
"Don't Worry 'Bout Me" (Rube Bloom/Koehler)—arr. by Riddle - 3:08
"My Funny Valentine" (Richard Rodgers/Lorenz Hart)—arr. by Riddle - 2:31
"They Can't Take That Away from Me" (George Gershwin/Ira Gershwin)—arr. by Riddle - 1:58
"I Get a Kick Out of You" (Porter)―arr. by Riddle - 2:55
"Young at Heart" (Carolyn Leigh/Johnny Richards)―arr. by Riddle - 2:52
"Last Night When We Were Young" (Arlen/Yip Harburg)―arr. by Riddle - 3:17
"Three Coins in the Fountain" (Styne/Cahn)―arr. by Riddle - 3:07
"Just One of Those Things" (Porter)―arr. by Riddle -3:14
"All of Me" (Seymour Simons/Gerald Marks)―arr. by Riddle - 2:08
"Someone to Watch Over Me" (G. Gershwin/I. Gershwin)―arr. by Riddle - 2:57
"I Get Along Without You Very Well (Except Sometimes)" (Hoagy Carmichael/Jane Brown Thompson)―arr. by Riddle - 3:42

Disc two
"This Love of Mine" (from "The Capitol Years") (Barry Parker/Hank Sanicola/Frank Sinatra)―arr. by Nelson Riddle - 3:33
"In the Wee Small Hours of the Morning" (from "The Capitol Years") (David Mann/Bob Hilliard)―arr. by Riddle - 3:00
"Learnin' the Blues" (from "The Capitol Years") (Dolores Vicki Silvers)―arr. by Riddle - 3:04
"Love and Marriage" (from "The Capitol Years") (Sammy Cahn/Jimmy Van Heusen)―arr. by Riddle - 2:37
"(Love Is) The Tender Trap" (from "The Capitol Years") (Cahn/Van Heusen)―arr. by Riddle - 2:58
"Love Is Here to Stay" (from "The Capitol Years") (George Gershwin/Ira Gershwin)―arr. by Riddle - 2:42
"You Make Me Feel So Young" (from "The Capitol Years") (Mack Gordon/Josef Myrow)―arr. by Riddle - 2:57
"Memories of You" (from "The Capitol Years") (Eubie Blake/Andy Razaf)―arr. by Riddle - 2:53
"I've Got You Under My Skin" (from "The Capitol Years") (Cole Porter)―arr. by Riddle - 3:43
"Too Marvelous for Words" (from "The Capitol Years") (Johnny Mercer/Richard A. Whiting)―arr. by  Riddle - 2:29
"(How Little It Matters) How Little We Know" (from "The Capitol Years") (Carolyn Leigh/Philip Springer)―arr. by Riddle
"I Couldn't Sleep a Wink Last Night" (from "The Capitol Years") (Harold Adamson/Jimmy McHugh)―arr. by Riddle - 3:25
"I Wish I Were in Love Again" (from "The Capitol Years") (Richard Rodgers/Lorenz Hart)―arr. by Riddle - 2:27
"The Lady Is a Tramp" (from "The Capitol Years") (Rodgers/Hart)―arr. by Riddle - 3:14
"From This Moment On" (from "The Capitol Years") (Porter)―arr. by Riddle - 3:50
"Laura" (from "The Capitol Years") (Mercer/David Raksin)―arr. by Gordon Jenkins - 3:28
"Where Are You?" (from "The Capitol Years") (Adamson/McHugh)―arr. by Jenkins - 3:30
"Witchcraft" (from "The Capitol Years") (Cy Coleman/Leigh)―arr. by Riddle - 2:53
"Bewitched, Bothered and Bewildered" (from "The Capitol Years") (Rodgers/Hart)―arr. by Riddle - 3:39
"All the Way" (from "The Capitol Years") (Cahn/Van Heusen)―arr. by Riddle - 2:52
"Moonlight in Vermont" (from "The Capitol Years") (John Blackburn/Karl Suessdorf)―arr. by Billy May - 3:32
"Come Fly with Me" (from "The Capitol Years") (Cahn/Van Heusen)―arr. by May - 3:16
"Put Your Dreams Away (For Another Day)" (from "The Capitol Years") (Ruth Lowe/Paul Mann/Stephan Weiss)―arr. by Riddle - 3:13
"Angel Eyes" (from "The Capitol Years") (Earl Brent/Matt Dennis)―arr. by Riddle - 3:43
"Guess I'll Hang My Tears Out to Dry" (from "The Capitol Years") (Cahn/Jule Styne)―arr. by Riddle - 4:00

Disc three
"Only the Lonely" (from "The Capitol Years") (Sammy Cahn/Jimmy Van Heusen)―arr. by Nelson Riddle - 4:10
"One for My Baby (and One More for the Road)" (from "The Capitol Years") (Harold Arlen/Johnny Mercer)―arr. by Riddle - 4:23
"Something's Gotta Give" (from "The Capitol Years") (Mercer)―arr. by Billy May - 2:38
"Come Dance with Me" (from "The Capitol Years") (Cahn/Van Heusen)―arr. by May - 2:31
"Here's That Rainy Day" (from "The Capitol Years") (Johnny Burke/Van Heusen)―arr. by Gordon Jenkins - 3:34
"A Cottage for Sale" (from "The Capitol Years") (Larry Conley/Willard Robison)―arr. by Jenkins - 3:16
"High Hopes" (from "The Capitol Years") (Cahn/Van Heusen)―arr. by Riddle - 2:42
"The Nearness of You" (from "The Capitol Years") (Hoagy Carmichael/Ned Washington)―arr. by Riddle - 2:43
"I've Got a Crush on You" (from "The Capitol Years") (George Gershwin/Ira Gershwin)―arr. by Riddle - 2:14
"Nice 'n' Easy" (from "The Capitol Years") (Alan and Marilyn Bergman/Lew Spence)―arr. by Riddle - 2:45
"(Ah, the Apple Trees) When the World Was Young" (from "Frank Sinatra: The Reprise Years") (Mercer/M. Philippe-Gerard/Angele Marie T. Vannier)―arr. by Axel Stordahl - 3:48
"In the Still of the Night" (from "Frank Sinatra: The Reprise Years") (Cole Porter)―arr. by Johnny Mandel - 3:25
"The Second Time Around" (from "Frank Sinatra: The Reprise Years") (Cahn/Van Heusen)―arr. by Riddle - 3:03
"Without a Song" (from "Frank Sinatra: The Reprise Years") (Billy Rose/Vincent Youmans/Edward Eliscu)―arr. by Sy Oliver - 3:39
"Love Walked In" (from "Frank Sinatra: The Reprise Years") (G. Gershwin/I. Gershwin)―arr. by May - 2:19
"Stardust" (from "Frank Sinatra: The Reprise Years") (Carmichael/Mitchell Parish)―arr. by Don Costa - 2:48
"Come Rain or Come Shine" (from "Frank Sinatra: The Reprise Years") (Arlen/Mercer)―arr. by Costa - 4:05
"The Girl Next Door" (from "Frank Sinatra: The Reprise Years") (Hugh Martin/Ralph Blane)―arr. by Jenkins - 3:18
"At Long Last Love" (from "Frank Sinatra: The Reprise Years") (Porter)―arr. by Neal Hefti - 2:14
"The Very Thought of You" (from "Frank Sinatra: The Reprise Years") (Ray Noble)―arr. by Robert Farnon - 3:34
"Pennies from Heaven" (from "Frank Sinatra: The Reprise Years") (Johnny Burke/Arthur Johnston)―arr. by Hefti - 2:43
"Ol' Man River" (from "Frank Sinatra: The Reprise Years") (Jerome Kern/Oscar Hammerstein II)―arr. by Riddle - 4:11
"I Have Dreamed" (from "Frank Sinatra: The Reprise Years") (Richard Rodgers/Hammerstein II)―arr. by Riddle - 3:01
"Luck Be a Lady" (from "Frank Sinatra: The Reprise Years") (Frank Loesser)―arr. by May - 5:14

Disc four
"The Way You Look Tonight" (from "Frank Sinatra: The Reprise Years") (Jerome Kern/Dorothy Fields)―arr. by Nelson Riddle - 3:24
"My Kind of Town" (from "Frank Sinatra: The Reprise Years") (Sammy Cahn/Jimmy Van Heusen)―arr. by Riddle - 3:10
"The Best is Yet to Come" (from "Frank Sinatra: The Reprise Years") (Cy Coleman/Carolyn Leigh)―arr. by  Quincy Jones - 2:56
"Fly Me to the Moon (In Other Words)" (from "Frank Sinatra: The Reprise Years") (Bart Howard)―arr. by Jones - 2:29
"Softly, as I Leave You" (from "Frank Sinatra: The Reprise Years") (Hal Shaper/Antonio DeVita/Giorgio Calabrese)―arr. by Ernie Freeman 
"It Was a Very Good Year" (from "Frank Sinatra: The Reprise Years") (Ervin Drake)―arr. by Gordon Jenkins - 4:25
"The September of My Years" (from "Frank Sinatra: The Reprise Years") (Cahn/Van Heusen)―arr. by Jenkins - 3:12
"Moonlight Serenade" (from "Frank Sinatra: The Reprise Years") (Glenn Miller/Mitchell Parish)―arr. by Riddle - 3:26
"Strangers in the Night" (from "Frank Sinatra: The Reprise Years") (Bert Kaempfert/Charles Singleton/Eddie Snyder)―arr. by Freeman - 2:36
"Summer Wind" (from "Frank Sinatra: The Reprise Years") (Heinz Meier/Hans Bradtke/Johnny Mercer)―arr. by Riddle - 2:53
"That's Life" (from "Frank Sinatra: The Reprise Years") (Kelly Gordon/Dean Thompson)―arr. by Freeman - 3:07
"I Concentrate on You" (duet with Antônio Carlos Jobim) (from "Frank Sinatra: The Reprise Years") (Cole Porter)―arr. by Claus Ogerman - 2:32
"The Girl from Ipanema (duet with Jobim)" (from "Frank Sinatra: The Reprise Years") (Jobim/Norman Gimbel/Vinícius de Moraes)―arr. by Ogerman - 3:14
"Drinking Again" (from "Frank Sinatra: The Reprise Years") (Mercer/Doris Tauber)―arr. by Ogerman - 3:13
"Somethin' Stupid (duet with Nancy Sinatra)" (from "Frank Sinatra: The Reprise Years") (Carson Parks)―arr. by Billy Strange - 2:45
"The World We Knew (Over and Over)" (from "Frank Sinatra: The Reprise Years") (Sigman/Kaempfert/Herb Rehbein)―arr. by Freeman - 2:25
"Cycles" (from "Frank Sinatra: The Reprise Years") (Judith Caldwell)―arr. by Costa - 3:13
"My Way" (from "Frank Sinatra: The Reprise Years") (Paul Anka/Jacques Revaux/Giles Thibault/Claude François)―arr. by  Costa - 4:35
"Wave" (from "Frank Sinatra: The Reprise Years") (Jobim)―arr. by Eumir Deodato - 3:25
"All My Tomorrows" (from "Frank Sinatra: The Reprise Years") (Cahn/Van Heusen)―arr. by Costa - 4:35
"Forget to Remember" (from "Frank Sinatra: The Reprise Years") (Victoria Pike/Teddy Randazzo)―arr. by Costa
"It Had to Be You" (from "Frank Sinatra: The Reprise Years") (Isham Jones/Gus Kahn)―arr. by May - 3:53
"All of You" (from "Frank Sinatra: The Reprise Years") (Porter)―arr. by May - 1:42
"Theme from New York, New York" (from "Frank Sinatra: The Reprise Years") (John Kander/Fred Ebb)―arr. by Costa - 3:26
"The Surrey With The Fringe On Top" (from Oklahoma!) (Rodgers/Hammerstein II)―arr. by May (Rehearsal) (previously unreleased) - 2:37

Double vinyl edition
Side A
"All Or Nothing At All"
"I’ll Never Smile Again"
"Saturday Night (Is The Loneliest Night Of The Week)"
"Nancy (With The Laughing Face)"
"I’ve Got The World On A String"
"Young At Heart"
"In The Wee Small Hours Of The Morning"

Side B
"Learnin’ The Blues"
"Love And Marriage"
"I’ve Got You Under My Skin"
"Witchcraft"
"All The Way"

Side C
"Come Fly With Me"
"One For My Baby (And One More For The Road)"
"The Way You Look Tonight"
"My Kind Of Town"
"Fly Me To The Moon (In Other Words)"
"It Was A Very Good Year"

Side D
"Strangers In The Night"
"Summer Wind"
"That’s Life"
"My Way"
"Theme From New York, New York"
"Put Your Dreams Away (For Another Day)"

Single CD / digital edition
"All or Nothing at All" – 2:58
"I'll Never Smile Again" – 3:10
"Saturday Night (Is the Loneliest Night of the Week)" – 2:44
"Nancy (With the Laughing Face)" – 3:13
"I've Got the World on a String" – 2:10
"Young at Heart" – 2:49
"In the Wee Small Hours of the Morning" – 2:59
"Learnin' the Blues" – 3:01
"Love and Marriage" – 2:38
"I've Got You Under My Skin" – 3:42
"Witchcraft" – 2:52
"All the Way" – 2:52
"Come Fly with Me" – 3:18
"One for My Baby (and One More for the Road)" – 4:24
"The Way You Look Tonight" – 3:21
"My Kind of Town" – 3:09
"Fly Me to the Moon" – 2:27
"It Was a Very Good Year" – 4:26
"Strangers in the Night" – 2:36
"Summer Wind" – 2:55
"That's Life" – 3:06
"My Way" – 4:35
"Theme from New York, New York" – 3:24
"Put Your Dreams Away" – 3:11
"Just in Time" (Alternate version, bonus track)
"Chicago (That Toddlin' Town)" (Digital-only bonus track) (Fred Fisher)

Chart performance
The 4 CD disc box set entitled Ultimate Sinatra: The Centennial Collection peaked at no. 2 on the Billboard Jazz Album Chart and no. 145 on the Billboard 200. The single disc album peaked at no. 1 on the Billboard Jazz Album chart and at no. 32 on the Billboard 200.

Charts and certifications

Year-end charts

Certifications

References

Frank Sinatra compilation albums
Compilation albums published posthumously
2015 compilation albums